Konstantinovsky District is an administrative and municipal district (raion), one of the forty-three in Rostov Oblast, Russia. It is located in the center of the oblast. Its administrative center is the town of Konstantinovsk. Population: 33,159 (2010 Census);  The population of Konstantinovsk accounts for 54.1% of the district's total population.

Notable residents 

Sergei Trufanov (1880–1952), hieromonk, preacher, pan-slavist

References

Notes

Sources

Districts of Rostov Oblast